Sale delle Langhe is a comune (municipality) in the Province of Cuneo in the Italian region Piedmont, located about  southeast of Turin and about  east of Cuneo.

The municipality of Sale delle Langhe contains the frazione (subdivision) Arbi.

Sale delle Langhe borders the following municipalities: Camerana, Ceva, Montezemolo, Priero, and Sale San Giovanni.

Demographic evolution

References

External links
 www.comune.saledellelanghe.cn.it/

Cities and towns in Piedmont
Comunità Montana Valli Mongia, Cevetta e Langa Cebana